Cerconota nymphas is a moth of the family Depressariidae. It is found in French Guiana.

The wingspan is 14–16 mm. The forewings are light violet, the costal edge whitish-yellowish and with a small dark fuscous costal mark at one-fourth, and some scattered undefined blackish dots and scales between this and the dorsum. The stigmata are small and blackish, the plical obliquely beyond the first discal and there is a narrow semi-oval dark brown costal spots at the middle and three-fourths, becoming blackish on the costal edge, the first sending an irregular curved series of very indistinct cloudy dark fuscous dots to three-fourths of the dorsum, the second a curved series of distinct blackish dots to the tornus. A marginal series of dark fuscous dots suffused with brown is found around the apex and termen. The hindwings are rather dark grey.

References

Moths described in 1916
Cerconota
Taxa named by Edward Meyrick